Parole refers to an action of the judiciary system.

Parole may also refer to:

Geography
Parole, Jammu and Kashmir, a town in the Indian state of Jammu and Kashmir
Parole, Maryland, an area near Annapolis in the United States
Parole Hunt Club in Parole, Maryland
Parole, Poland

Arts and entertainment
Parole (2018 film), an Indian Malayalam film
Parole (2022 film), an Indian Tamil film
Parole, a 1982 television film featuring Ellen Barkin
Parole, first reality court show, airing in 1959
 "Paroles", a song by Mike Ink from A Bugged Out Mix

Other uses
Parole (horse), a race horse during the 19th century
Parole (linguistics), language in use in the theory of Ferdinand de Saussure
Parole (United States immigration), a term with three meanings pertaining to U.S. immigration laws